Hamed Ehdadi Haddadi (born May 19, 1985) is an Iranian professional basketball player for Sichuan Blue Whales of the Chinese Basketball Association (CBA). He plays at the center position and is 7'2" (2.18 meters) tall and weighs 254 lbs (115 kilograms). Haddadi was the first Iranian to play in the National Basketball Association (NBA) when he debuted with the Memphis Grizzlies in 2008. He played with the Grizzlies until 2013 before bouncing around the league with the Toronto Raptors and the Phoenix Suns. In 2013, he returned home to Iran before playing in China. Haddadi is regarded as the greatest Iranian basketball player of all time.

Professional career

Iran
Before officially playing for a professional Iranian team, Haddadi started his basketball stint with a hometown team of his known as Shahin Ahvaz. His stint there would ultimately allow Haddadi to play in the Iranian Basketball Super League with Paykan Tehran and Saba Battery. In 2004, Haddadi would also play for Sanam Tehran for a bit as well. In August 2007, while still playing in Iran, he rejected a contract offer from the Serbian League team Partizan Belgrade in order to play for Saba Battery.

During the 2011 NBA lockout, Haddadi signed a short-term contract with his hometown team, Melli Haffari Ahvaz. During this period Haddadi received no salary from the team.

During the 2013 offseason, Haddadi signed a short-term contract with Foolad Mahan Isfahan. After his first stint with the Chinese Basketball Association, Haddadi would return to Iran once again to play for Mahram Tehran to play out the rest of their season.

On March 9, 2016, Haddadi signed with Petrochimi Bandar Imam of the Iranian Super League. However, he wouldn't make his debut until later on in March due to his CBA Finals duties with the Sichuan Blue Whales at the time. He would return to that same team once again after the 2016-17 CBA season concluded for Sichuan. This time around, however, he would play for them for the entirety of the 2017–18 season.

United Arab Emirates
In 2003, Haddadi was assigned by Paykan Tehran to play for Al-Nasr from Dubai in the United Arab Emirates for a short period of time. He would ultimately return with Paykan after his stint with Al-Nasr.

NBA career

Memphis Grizzlies
Before the 2004 NBA draft, Haddadi declared himself eligible for the draft as an early entrant. However, he went undrafted in the draft and therefore became a free agent who is free to sign with any NBA team.

Haddadi received offers from NBA teams prior to the 2008 Summer Olympics and stated he would sign with a team after the games. Complications existed because of legal restrictions regarding business dealings between U.S. companies and Iranian citizens.

On August 28, 2008, Haddadi signed with the NBA's Memphis Grizzlies as a free-agent. Haddadi scored four points in 17 minutes of action in his first NBA preseason game, an October 7, 2008 loss at the Houston Rockets.

Haddadi averaged 1.7 points and 3.3 rebounds in 9.7 minutes in six preseason games with the Grizzlies, and  made his regular season debut on December 30, when he played 4 minutes in a loss against the Phoenix Suns, hitting both of his free throws and grabbing one rebound.

On November 25, 2008, Memphis assigned Haddadi to the Dakota Wizards of the NBA D-League. On Tuesday, December 23, 2008, Haddadi was recalled by the Grizzlies.  Haddadi scored a then career-high 10 points, with 8 rebounds and a block in less than 10 minutes to key a 12–0 run in the 4th quarter, sparking the Grizzlies to a come-from-behind victory at the Golden State Warriors on March 30, 2009.

On December 31, 2011, he re-signed with the Memphis Grizzlies a one-year $1.3 million contract. On April 17, 2012, Hamed came off the bench to score 8 points in 12 minutes and give the Grizzlies a boost to lead them to a victory over the rival Minnesota Timberwolves. On July 28, 2012, Haddadi re-signed with the Memphis Grizzlies.

On January 30, 2013, Haddadi was traded to the Toronto Raptors along with Rudy Gay as part of a three-way deal that sent José Calderón to the Detroit Pistons and Ed Davis, Tayshaun Prince, Austin Daye, and a second round pick to the Memphis Grizzlies. However, Haddadi could not immediately report to the Raptors due to immigration issues.  He would never play a single game for the Raptors.

Phoenix Suns
On February 21, 2013, the Raptors traded Haddadi and a second-round draft pick to the Phoenix Suns for Sebastian Telfair. During his tenure with the Suns, Haddadi decided to wear the number 98 as a tribute of sorts to his home nation's national telephone code.

Haddadi did not play for the Suns until March 6, 2013, in a game against the Raptors, the team that Haddadi was first traded to. On March 9, 2013, Haddadi recorded 6 points, 3 blocks and a career-high 11 rebounds in 28 minutes off the bench, contributing to the Suns 107–105 win over the Houston Rockets.

Despite gaining professional career highs in his short stint with the team, Haddadi was waived by the Suns on June 29, 2013.

China
In September 2013, Haddadi signed with the Sichuan Blue Whales of the Chinese Basketball Association as the bonus foreign Asian player that's allowed to be on the expansion CBA team.

On September 15, 2014, Haddadi agreed to terms with Qingdao DoubleStar Eagles. With Haddadi's help, the Eagles were one of the top teams during the 2014–15 season. During his time in Qingdao, Haddadi would average 20.4 points, 13.9 rebounds, 3.7 assists, and 2.3 blocks for the team's surprise rise. However, due to Qingdao's success that season, they could not re-sign him afterwards.

In September 2015, Haddadi returned to the Sichuan Blue Whales as their bonus foreign Asian player due to them having one of the worst records that season. During his second stint in Sichuan, Haddadi would help the team reach their first playoff stint in CBA history. He would help the Blue Whales sweep the Zhejiang Lions in the first round and the Xinjiang Flying Tigers in the second round before playing in the championship series against the Liaoning Flying Leopards. Before Haddadi would return to his home nation with Petrochimi Bandar Imam in Iran, he would help finish the job that was needed with the Blue Whales, as he would help lead Sichuan to a 4–1 Finals series win over the Liaoning Flying Leopards, and thus becoming the CBA Finals MVP in the process. After finishing his most recent stint in his home nation, he'd return to Sichuan as an exception player for the two international players allowed on their roster.

After taking a year off from Chinese basketball, Haddadi returned to the CBA once again, this time playing as a starting centre for the Xinjiang Flying Tigers.

National team career

Haddadi won a silver medal at the 2002 Asian Under-18 Championship and a gold medal at the 2004 Asian U20 Championship while playing on Iran's junior national teams. He won gold medals at the 2004 and 2005 West Asian Championships with the senior Iranian national basketball team.

Haddadi also won a bronze medal at the 2006 Asian Games and gold medals at the 2007 FIBA Asia Championship, 2009 FIBA Asia Championship, and the 2013 FIBA Asia Championship. He was also named the MVP of the latter three tournaments.

At the 2008 Summer Olympics in Beijing, he led the tournament with the highest average blocked shots per game and rebounds per game.

Haddadi was involved in a brawl in the 2009 William Jones cup against team Jordan, which was a vital game in the cup. It later led to the outcome of the championship where Iran won despite having a 6–2 standing while Jordan had a 7–1 record.

Haddadi led team Iran to back-to-back FIBA Asia championships, where they beat Jordan in the semifinals 77–75, and defeated tournament favorite and host China, 70–52.

Haddadi scored a game high 18 points in a loss to France in the preliminary round of the 2020 Olympics in Tokyo.

Other ventures
In September 2009, Haddadi hosted a weekend basketball camp for children on the campus of California State University, Northridge. The camp catered mainly to the Iranian American community, and coaches included Haddadi himself, his manager, Mayar Zokaei, Los Angeles Lakers forward Ron Artest (now known as Metta World Peace), and Iranian professional basketball players Behdad Sami and Benny Koochoie, amongst others. The camp attracted over 100 children and was the first sports camp ever by an Iranian athlete in the United States.

Haddadi also spearheaded the Hamed Haddadi Javanan Foundation, a charity organization formed with the intention of awarding college scholarships to student athletes across the nation.

NBA career statistics

Regular season

|-
| style="text-align:left;"| 
| style="text-align:left;"| Memphis
| 19 || 0 || 6.3 || .484 || .000 || .600 || 2.5 || .4 || .1 || .6 || 2.5
|-
| style="text-align:left;"| 
| style="text-align:left;"| Memphis
| 36 || 0 || 6.7 || .387 || .000 || .737 || 2.1 || .3 || .0 || .4 || 1.7
|-
| style="text-align:left;"| 
| style="text-align:left;"| Memphis
| 31 || 0 || 5.4 || .517 || .000 || .652 || 2.2 || .2 || .1 || .4 || 2.4
|-
| style="text-align:left;"| 
| style="text-align:left;"| Memphis
| 35 || 0 || 5.9 ||.542 || .000 || .692 || 2.0 || .2 || .0 || .7 || 2.0 
|-
| style="text-align:left;"| 
| style="text-align:left;"| Memphis
| 13 || 0 || 6.7  || .333 || .000 || .500 || 1.8 || .3 || .1 || .5 || 1.2
|-
| style="text-align:left;"| 
| style="text-align:left;"| Phoenix
| 17 || 0 || 13.8  || .459 || .000 || .520 || 5.1 || .5 || .3 || 1.2 || 4.1
|- class="sortbottom"
| style="text-align:centre;" colspan="2"| Career
| 151 || 0 || 7.0 || .463 || .000 || .632 || 2.5 || .3 || .1 || .6 || 2.2

Playoffs

|-
| style="text-align:left;"| 2011
| style="text-align:left;"| Memphis
| 9 || 0 || 3.4 || .300 || .000 || .833 || .9 || .0 || .0 || .6 || 1.2
|-
| style="text-align:left;"| 2012
| style="text-align:left;"| Memphis
| 4 || 0 || 5.3 || 1.000 || .000 || .500 || 2.3 || .3 || .0 || .5 || 1.3
|-
|- class="sortbottom"
| style="text-align:centre;" colspan="2"| Career
| 13 || 0 || 3.9 || .417 || .000 || .750 || 1.3 || .1 || .0 || .5 || 1.2

Honors

National team

 Asian Cup
Gold medal: 2007, 2009, 2013
Silver medal: 2017
Bronze medal: 2015
 Asian Games
Silver medal: 2014, 2018
Bronze medal: 2006
 FIBA Asia Challenge
Gold medal: 2014, 2016
 Asian Under-20 Championship
Gold medal: 2004
 Asian Under-18 Championship
Silver medal: 2002

Club
 Asian Champions Cup
Gold medal: 2008 (Saba Battery)
Gold medal: 2013 (Foolad Mahan)
 Chinese Basketball Association
Champions: 2016 (Sichuan Blue Whales)
 Iranian Basketball Super League
Champions: 2017, 2018 (Petrochimi)

Individual
 Asian Cup
MVP: 2007, 2009, 2013, 2017 
FIBA Asia Challenge
MVP: 2014
William Jones Cup
MVP: 2013
Chinese Basketball Association
All-Star: 2014, 2016
CBA Finals MVP: 2016

References

External links

(NBA.com profile archived)
FIBA.com Profile
Player Profile ESPN.com

1985 births
Living people
Asian Games bronze medalists for Iran
Asian Games silver medalists for Iran
Asian Games medalists in basketball
Basketball players at the 2006 Asian Games
Basketball players at the 2008 Summer Olympics
Basketball players at the 2014 Asian Games
Basketball players at the 2018 Asian Games
Basketball players at the 2020 Summer Olympics
Centers (basketball)
Dakota Wizards players
Expatriate basketball people in Italy
Foolad Mahan Isfahan BC players
Iranian men's basketball players
Iranian expatriate basketball people in China
Iranian expatriate basketball people in Lebanon
Iranian expatriate basketball people in the United Arab Emirates
Iranian expatriate basketball people in the United States
Mahram Tehran BC players
Medalists at the 2006 Asian Games
Medalists at the 2014 Asian Games
Medalists at the 2018 Asian Games
Melli Haffari club sportspeople
Memphis Grizzlies players
National Basketball Association players from Iran
Olympic basketball players of Iran
People from Ahvaz
Petrochimi Bandar Imam BC players
Phoenix Suns players
Qingdao Eagles players
Sichuan Blue Whales players
Undrafted National Basketball Association players
Xinjiang Flying Tigers players
2010 FIBA World Championship players
2014 FIBA Basketball World Cup players
2019 FIBA Basketball World Cup players
Sportspeople from Khuzestan province